The WWL Extreme Championship (Campeonato Extremo de la WWL in Spanish) is a professional wrestling championship promoted by the World Wrestling League (WWL) promotion in Puerto Rico.

The championship was generally contested in professional wrestling matches, in which participants execute scripted finishes rather than contend in direct competition under extreme rules, it is meaning that everything is permitted.

Title history

References

Hardcore wrestling championships
World Wrestling League Championships